Lazaros Petropoulakis (born 25 June 1925) was a Greek sprinter. He competed in the men's 4 × 400 metres relay at the 1948 Summer Olympics.

References

External links
 

1925 births
Possibly living people
Athletes (track and field) at the 1948 Summer Olympics
Greek male sprinters
Greek male hurdlers
Olympic athletes of Greece
Athletes from Athens
20th-century Greek people